Astro Wah Lai Toi is a Cantonese Video on demand  (Formerly from Cantonese TV Channel) owned and operated by Astro in partnership with Hong Kong's TVB. The channel offers mainly TVB programming, alongside some local content.

To satisfy a greater audience, selected programmes are available in dual audio, in which viewers can select either to watch the programme in Cantonese or Mandarin (or original language of the programme). Subtitles are also available with English, Bahasa Malaysia & Chinese languages by pressing the subtitle button.

History
Since the Malaysian government does not allow any television station to be operated by foreigners; Hong Kong's TVB collaborated with Astro to launch Astro Wah Lai Toi. It benefits over 100 million HK dollars every year from Astro by providing 85% programs on primetime slots. Moreover, TVB is the advertising agency of Astro Wah Lai Toi and offers counselling service for it.

Astro had been mistaken for holding an exclusive right as the sole pay-TV service in Malaysia to broadcast TVB programmes; rather, it holds such right to broadcast TVB programmes on the entirety of one channel which it runs.

About 80% of the channel programmes were mirrored by Astro Zhi Zun HD until it was renamed to Astro Wah Lai Toi HD on 6 October 2014.

Astro Wah Lai Toi is made available for NJOI Prepaid from 3 June 2015 onwards.

Starting 1 April 2020, Astro Wah Lai Toi HD will begin to be exclusively available via On demand (VOD) and On the GO. Some of the successors of Astro Wah Lai Toi HD are TVB Jade Malaysia (Channel 310) and Astro AOD HD (Channel 311, SD On Channel 351).

As of 1 May 2020, Astro Wah Lai Toi HD has been completely transitioned to Video on demand.

Programming

Astro Wah Lai Toi started to air programmes that were used by TVB to fight against Asia Television Limited. The first show was Healing Souls which was outsourced by Asia Television Limited.

Astro Wah Lai Toi Drama Awards
Since 2004, Astro Wah Lai Toi have held Astro Wah Lai Toi Drama Awards every year. All the awards receivers are 100% voted by the audiences. Astro Wah Lai Toi selected the TVB dramas that were played that year and published the nominated list at an appropriate time. Usually the dramas Astro Wah Lai Toi played were the ones HK Jade played in the previous year. For instance, the dramas Astro Wah Lai Toi played in 2007 was the ones that have been played in 2006. The award was succeeded by My AOD Favourites Awards and TVB Star Awards Malaysia in 2010 and 2013, respectively. Furthermore, Astro Wah Lai Toi also holds many major events, such as Astro Star Quest, Miss Astro Chinese International Pageant, Astro Wah Lai Toi Drama Awards, etc.

Live programmes
Astro Wah Lai Toi broadcasts HK major live events, but all charity programmes held by TVB are broadcast live by another channel which is Astro On Demand.

External links
 Astro Wah Lai Toi's official website
 Astro Wah Lai Toi on Facebook

Astro Malaysia Holdings television channels
Television channels and stations established in 1996